Martina Thomson, stage name Martina Mayne, (c. 1925–2013) was a German actress, art therapist, poet and translator, active in England. In 2009 she produced the first published translation into English of the work of the German poet Paula Ludwig.

Early life and family
Martina Thomson was born Martina Schulof in Berlin around 1925 to Austrian parents. She was educated at the Rudolf Steiner school there but travelled to London with her family just before the start of the Second World War where her uncle, George Hoellering, worked at the Academy Cinema in Oxford Street. She was evacuated to the Cotswolds during the war and afterwards trained as an actor at the Royal Academy of Dramatic Art.

Her first marriage was short. In 1964 she married, secondly, the BBC sound producer David Thomson with whom she had three sons, Tim, Luke and Ben. She had eight grandchildren and a great-grandchild at the time of her death.

Career
Under the stage name of Martina Mayne, she acted in radio plays produced for the BBC by her husband and often played foreign roles in England and English ones on German radio. In 1952 she appeared on the panel for One Minute Please, the forerunner to the BBC's long-running Just a Minute. She later provided voices for erotic films. In 1967 she appeared with Quentin Crisp as Marcella in the short surrealist film Captain Busby The Even Tenour of Her Ways based on a poem by Philip O'Connor.

In the 1970s, she trained as an art therapist under E. M. Lyddiatt and in 1989 wrote On Art and Therapy. Her poetry was published in magazines and collected in Ferryboats in 2007. In 2009 she produced the first published translation into English of the work of the German expressionist poet Paula Ludwig, whom she remembered visiting her parents' home in Berlin.

Death
Mayne died from pneumonia in 2013 at the age of 88 after suffering from bone cancer.

Selected roles
 I'm a Stranger – Mary (1952)
 "The Case of the Greystone Inscription" – Millicent Channing (1955)
  Captain Busby The Even Tenour of Her Ways – Marcella (1967) - starring Quentin Crisp

Selected publications
 On art and therapy: An exploration. Virago, 1989. 
 Ferryboats. Hearing Eye, London, 2007. (Torriano Meeting House Poetry Pamphlet) 
 Panther and gazelle: Poems of Paula Ludwig. Hearing Eye, London, 2012. (Translator) 
 My life, you see. Hearing Eye, London, 2022.  ISBN 978-1-905082-79-7

References 

2013 deaths
German emigrants to England
Actresses from Berlin
Art therapists
German actresses
Deaths from pneumonia in England
German people of Austrian descent
German–English translators
1920s births
Year of birth uncertain
German poets
German women poets
20th-century translators